The Australasian Schools English Competition is a literary competition open to school students in years 3–12 in Australia and New Zealand. It is run by the University of New South Wales Educational Testing Centre.

It is a test with about 60 questions for comprehension, spelling, grammar and general knowledge. It is a test open to all schools and all children. The student who scores the highest grade wins prizes and/or money.

Education competitions in Australia